(–)-γ-Cadinene synthase (EC 4.2.3.62, (2Z,6E)-farnesyl diphosphate cyclizing) ((–)-γ-cadinene cyclase) is an enzyme with the systematic name (2Z,6E)-farnesyl-diphosphate diphosphate-lyase ((–)-γ-cadinene-forming). This enzyme catalyses the following chemical reaction:

 (2Z,6E)-farnesyl diphosphate  (–)-γ-cadinene + [diphosphate]

This enzyme is isolated from the liverwort Heteroscyphus planus.

References

External links 

EC 4.2.3